Joaquin Camacho Arriola (December 25, 1925 – May 4, 2022) was an American attorney and Democratic Party of Guam politician in Guam. Arriola served as a senator in the Guam Legislature from 1955 to 1959 and as a senator in and Speaker of the Guam Legislature from 1967 to 1971, ran for Governor of Guam in 1974, and was the husband of former senator in the Guam Legislature Elizabeth P. Arriola.

Early life
Arriola was born on December 25, 1925, in Agana, Guam, to Vicente F. Arriola and Maria S. Arriola.

He graduated cum laude with a Bachelor of Arts at the College of St. Thomas in 1950. He earned his Juris Doctor at the University of Minnesota Law School in 1953. He was admitted to the Bar for Minnesota in 1953.

Professional life
Arriola was elected to the Guam Legislature in 1954 and served for two consecutive terms. Arriola was admitted to the Guam Bar in 1957. He served as legal counsel for the 5th, 6th, and 7th Guam Legislatures from 1959 until 1965. Arriola served as a Selective Service Government Appeal Agent from 1959 until 1971.

Guam Legislature

Elections

Leadership
 Speaker, 9th Guam Legislature (1967-1969)
 Speaker, 10th Guam Legislature (1969-1971)

Joaquin C. Arriola and Vicente Bamba
In 1970, Arriola teamed up with Vicente Bamba in the Democratic Party of Guam Gubernatorial Primary. In the primary, Arriola-Bamba faced the teams of Ricardo J. Bordallo and Richard F. Taitano and former appointed governor Manuel F. Leon Guerrero and Antonio C. Yamashita. The Bordallo-Taitano team faced the Republican team of Camacho-Moylan in the 1970 Guam Gubernatorial General Election.

Arriola-Nelson gubernatorial ticket
In 1974, Arriola teamed up with Ted S. Nelson in the Democratic Party of Guam Gubernatorial Primary. In the primary, Arriola-Nelson placed 4th against the teams of Ricardo J. Bordallo and Rudolph G. Sablan, Pedro C. Sanchez and Esteban U. Torres, and Manuel F.L. Guerrero and David D.L. Flores, with 1,254 votes.

Leadership
 President, Guam Bar Association (1956-1957)
 Chairman, Territorial Planning Commission (1962-1966)
 Chairman, Guam Housing and Urban Renewal Authority (1963-1964)
 Chairman, Board of Regents, College of Guam (1963-1966)
 Associate Justice (Part Time), Supreme Court of Guam (1996-2006)

Personal life
Arriola died on May 4, 2022, at the age of 96.

References

1925 births
2022 deaths
20th-century American politicians
Chamorro people
Guamanian Democrats
Guamanian people of Spanish descent
Guamanian Roman Catholics
Members of the Legislature of Guam
People from Hagåtña, Guam
University of Minnesota Law School alumni
University of St. Thomas (Minnesota) alumni
Guamanian lawyers
Minnesota lawyers